Warlocks Motorcycle Club may refer to two different, unaffiliated outlaw motorcycle clubs:

 Warlocks Motorcycle Club (Pennsylvania), a motorcycle club based in Philadelphia, the Delaware Valley, and South Jersey
 Warlocks Motorcycle Club (Florida), a motorcycle club based in Florida